Melba is an American sitcom that aired on CBS from January 28, 1986, until September 13, 1986. The series was a vehicle for singer/actress Melba Moore.

Summary
The show was about the home and work life of Melba Patterson (Moore), a divorced mother who was the director of New York's Manhattan Visitors Center. Melba was raising her 9-year-old daughter Tracy (Jamilla Perry) with the help of her mother Rose (Barbara Meek) and her white "sister", Susan Slater (Gracie Harrison). Melba and Susan had been close since childhood, since Rose was Susan's family's housekeeper when they were growing up. Jack (Lou Jacobi) and young Gil (Evan Mirand) worked for Melba at the visitors' center.

Cast
Melba Moore as Melba Patterson
Jamilla Perry as Tracy Patterson
Gracie Harrison as Susan Slater
Barbara Meek as Mama Rose
Lou Jacobi as Jack
Evan Mirand as Gil

Episodes

External links

Melba at Sale Into the 90s

1980s American black sitcoms
1980s American sitcoms
CBS original programming
1986 American television series debuts
1986 American television series endings
Television series by Sony Pictures Television
Television shows set in New York City
English-language television shows